Mozambican Sign Language is the principal language of the deaf community of Mozambique. It is reported to have "some dialectal variation", and to be spoken in at least the three largest cities of Maputo, Beira, and Nampula. As of 1999, there were efforts at standardization. MSL is not based on Portuguese Sign Language—or for that matter on American Sign Language—but other than that, its origin is not recorded.

References

Sign languages
Languages of Mozambique